Clérambard  is a 1969 French comedy film directed by Yves Robert and starring Philippe Noiret, Dany Carrel and Lise Delamare. It is based on the 1950 play (fr) by Marcel Aymé. Set in France shortly before 1914, it tells the story of an impoverished aristocrat who undergoes a religious conversion and, abandoning his ancestral castle, takes his family to live like gypsies.

Plot
In a crumbling medieval castle, the penniless Count of Clérembard tyrannises his wife, his son Octave, and his mother-in-law. Their only income comes from knitting and selling pullovers, and their only meat from what the Count can shoot in the vicinity. The local lawyer, Galuchon, offers to pay off the Count's vast debts if Octave will marry the eldest of his three daughters: the youngest is a beauty, the next pretty, and the eldest a fright. While the Count is ready to grab this solution to his problems, Octave rebels. Though he has never been able to afford her, he is in love with La Langouste, the town's prostitute. 

Gustalin, a neighbouring farmer fed up with his livestock disappearing to the Count's gun, decides to give him a fright. Dressing as St Francis of Assisi, he suddenly appears before him and gives him a book of the saint's deeds. On reading it, the Count decides to renounce all worldly goods and, after selling the castle to Galuchon, to take to the road with his family in a gypsy caravan, sharing the life of the poor and communing with nature. If Octave really loves La Langouste, why shouldn't he marry her? She is half-convinced about retiring from her trade and gives Octave a free session. 

When Galuchon arrives to sign the deed for the sale of the castle, he brings his three daughters. Octave, emboldened by his experience with La Langouste, takes the youngest into the empty caravan and afterwards tells Galuchon that he will marry her in return for an annual allowance. The Count is sorry that La Langouste has been jilted and says she can join them in the caravan anyhow.
Gustalin reappears to say that he is sorry to have misled the Count, who has now lost his castle, but the Count doesn't mind as he is set on his new life. In the town square, the people see two angels harness his horse to the caravan and they all follow it out into the countryside.

Cast
 Philippe Noiret ...  Hector, Count of Clérambard
 Martine Sarcey ...  Louise, Countess of  Clérambard
 Gérard Lartigau ...  Octave, their son
 Lise Delamare ...  Madame de Léré, mother of Louise
 Dany Carrel ...  La Langouste
 Robert Dalban ...  Gustalin, the neighbouring farmer
 Claude Piéplu ...  Maître Galuchon, the lawyer
 Lyne Chardonnet ...  Brigitte Galuchon
 Josiane Lévêque ...  Évelyne Galuchon
 Françoise Arnaud ...  Étiennette Galuchon 
 Roger Carel ...  The parish priest

References

External links
 

1969 films
1960s French-language films
French films based on plays
Films based on works by Marcel Aymé
Films directed by Yves Robert
1969 comedy films
French comedy films
Films with screenplays by Jean-Loup Dabadie
Films scored by Vladimir Cosma
1960s French films